Brainstorm is a British comedy quiz programme about science. It originally aired on BBC1 for one series in 1988, hosted by Kenny Everett and co-hosted by Cleo Rocos.

References

External links

BBC television game shows
1988 British television series debuts
1988 British television series endings
1980s British game shows
Television game shows with incorrect disambiguation